Highway 351 (AR 351, Ark. 351, and Hwy. 351) is a designation for two state highways in Northeast Arkansas. One route  in Jonesboro begins at the Interstate 555/US Highway 63 (I-555/US 63) frontage road and runs north to Highway 18 as Industrial Drive. A second route of  begins at Airport Road and runs north to Highway 358. Between Jonesboro and the northern terminus, the route is designated as part of the Crowley's Ridge Parkway, a National Scenic Byway, and two Civil War trails under the Arkansas Heritage Trails System. Both routes are maintained by the Arkansas State Highway and Transportation Department (AHTD).

Route description

Industrial Drive
The route begins at the north frontage road for Interstate 555/U.S. Route 63 in Jonesboro, the most populous city in Northeast Arkansas. The route runs due north to a skewed intersection with US 63B before terminating at Highway 18.

Jonesboro to Greene County
AR 351 begins at Airport Road in Jonesboro east of the BNSF railroad tracks, near Jonesboro Municipal Airport. The route runs northeast before overlapping US 49/AR 1. Highway 351 proceeds to run north to terminate at AR 358.

Between US 49/Highway 1 western junction and County Road 766, the route is part of the Crowley's Ridge Parkway, a National Scenic Byway.

Two Civil War Trail designations follow Highway 351 between Jonesboro and Highway 358; the Steele's Movements trail during the Second Phase Pea Ridge Campaign, and the Davidson's Approach during the Little Rock Campaign. Both designations represent Highway 351's historic prominence as a main north-south route between Paragould and Jonesboro.

History

Major intersections

See also

References

External links

351
Crowley's Ridge Parkway
351
Transportation in Craighead County, Arkansas
Transportation in Greene County, Arkansas
1966 establishments in Arkansas